3U or 3-U may refer to:

Sichuan Airlines's IATA code
A type of Rack unit
Zerstörergeschwader 26, from its historic Geschwaderkennung code with the Luftwaffe in World War II
A CubeSat measuring 30×10×10 cm
The acronym for the third (3rd) catalog of Uhuru x-ray sources

See also
 U3 (disambiguation)